The fourth season of NCIS: New Orleans, an American police procedural drama television series, originally aired on CBS from September 26, 2017 to May 15, 2018. The season was produced by CBS Television Studios.

Cast and characters

Main
 Scott Bakula as Dwayne Cassius Pride, NCIS Supervisory Special Agent (SSA)
 Lucas Black as Christopher LaSalle, NCIS Senior Field Agent (SFA)
 Vanessa Ferlito as Tammy Gregorio, NCIS Special Agent (SA)
 Rob Kerkovich as Sebastian Lund, NCIS SA
 Daryl "Chill" Mitchell as Patton Plame, NCIS Computer Specialist
 Shalita Grant as Sonja Percy, NCIS SA (episodes 1–19)
 C. C. H. Pounder as Loretta Wade, Jefferson Parish Medical Examiner

Recurring
 Shanley Caswell as Laurel Pride, Dwayne Pride's daughter
 Christopher Meyer as Danny Malloy, Loretta's elder foster son
 Derek Webster as Raymond Isler, FBI Senior Special Agent
 Chelsea Field as Rita Devereaux, Pride's lover
 Riann Steele as Sydney Halliday
 Amanda Warren as Zahra Taylor, interim mayor and later Mayor of New Orleans
 Matt Servitto as Carl Estes, NOPD captain
 Mark Gessner as Oliver Crane
 Doug Savant as U.S. Associate Attorney General (AAG) Eric Barlow
 Ellen Hollman as Amelia Parsons Stone, AAG Barlow's aide
 Lou Diamond Phillips as Deputy Chief Gossett, AAG Barlow's accomplice
 Antino Crowley-Kamenwati as Lonzo Cortez, AAG Barlow's accomplice
 Stacey Keach as Cassius Pride, Dwayne Pride's incarcerated father
 Steven Waldren as Roy, the NCIS Security Guard

Guests
 Carlos Gomez as Dan Sanchez, NCIS Deputy Director
 Cassidy Freeman as Eva Azarova
 Kelly Hu as Doctor Anna Yoon, Ex-wife of Patton
 Steven Weber as Douglas Hamilton, disgraced former Mayor of New Orleans.
 Joey Vahedi as Sharif Saadi
 Peter Rini as Vernon Butler, Taylor's opponent in the mayoral election.
 Najla Said as Noora Saadi
 Michael Mulheren as Ron Cook
 Sarah Schreiber as Female Dealer

Episodes

Production

Development
NCIS: New Orleans was renewed for a fourth season on March 23, 2017, with a 24-episode order. NCIS: New Orleans was renewed for a fifth season on April 18, 2018.

Casting
On January 31, 2018, Shalita Grant who plays NCIS agent Sonja Percy would be departing after the nineteenth episode of the season.

Broadcast
Season four of NCIS New Orleans premiered on September 26, 2017.

Ratings

References

External links

04
2017 American television seasons
2018 American television seasons